Neil Andrew Patrick Carson  (born 15 April 1957) is a British businessman, who was the chief executive (CEO) of Johnson Matthey, a British multinational chemicals and precious metals company, from 2004 to 2014.

Early life
Carson grew up in south London and attended Emanuel School. He has an engineering degree from Coventry University.

Career
Carson joined Johnson Matthey in 1980, and was appointed to the board of in 2002, and promoted to CEO in 2004. Since 2010, Carson has been a non-executive director of AMEC plc.

Carson retired in 2014, and was succeeded as CEO of Johnson Matthey by Robert MacLeod.

Carson is a member of the advisory board for the Cambridge Programme for Sustainability Leadership. Carson has also served as chairman of the UK government's sustainable consumption and production taskforce.

Honours and awards
In 2010, he was awarded an honorary doctorate by Anglia Ruskin University.

Carson was appointed Officer of the Order of the British Empire (OBE) in the 2016 Birthday Honours for services to the chemical industry.

References

Living people
1957 births
Businesspeople from London
People in the chemical industry
British chief executives
British corporate directors
Alumni of Coventry University
Officers of the Order of the British Empire
People educated at Emanuel School